Crazy Romance (求愛反斗星) is a 1985 Hong Kong romantic comedy film directed by Tommy Leung and starring Natalis Chan, Sylvia Chang and Leslie Cheung.

Cast
Natalis Chan as Hung Ka-po
Sylvia Chang as Cheung Ka-ka
Leslie Cheung as Leslie Cheung
Siu Kwok-wah as Mak Chiu
David Wu as Hui Koon-yan
Charlie Cho as Prison Officer Lau
Fung King-man as Killer Wahle
Hoi Sang Lee as Prison guard in van
Michelle Sze-ma as Ka-po's fake girlfriend
Tam Chuen-hing as Officer Tam
Ng Ha-ping as Monica
Alan Chan as Piggy
Lee Ka-ting as Ting
Benz Kong as Gay pedestrian
Wong Ying-kit as Gay pedestrian
Shing Fui-On as Angry car driver
Ha Miu-yin as Leslie's new interest in pub
Shun Wai as Driving test
Tommy Leung as Learner driver
Chan Chuen as Traffic cop
Ng Man-tat as Inspector at airport
Yue Tau-wan as Man eyeing Ka-ka's wallet on the street
Siao San-yan as Fortune teller
Wong Nga-man as One of Leslie's girlfriend
Chiu Jun-chiu as Biker challenging Ka-po
Garry Chan as Piggy's thug
Lee Yeung-to as Policeman chasing Ka-po in alley
Fok Ka-lai as Policeman chasing Ka-po in alley
Cheung Kwok-wah as Prisoner
Lam foo-wai as Prisoner
Fei Pak as Prison officer
Alric Ma as Policeman

References

External links
 IMDB entry
 HK cinemagic entry

1985 films
1985 romantic comedy films
Hong Kong romantic comedy films
1980s Cantonese-language films
Films set in Hong Kong
Films shot in Hong Kong
1980s Hong Kong films